Aitebaar is a Pakistani drama television series aired on Aaj Entertainment in 2015-2016. It features Adnan Siddiqui, Nausheen Shah and Saniya Shamshad in leading roles.

Cast
Adnan Siddiqui as Junaid: a loving and caring husband of Nazneen 
Saniya Shamshad as Nageen aka Niggi: a simple and orphan girl living with her aunt and uncle 
Nausheen Shah as Nazneen aka Nazo: Nageen's cousin sister, Junaid's wife.
Manzoor Qureshi: Nazneen's father and Nageen's uncle.
Azra Mohyeddin as Fakhira: Nazneen's mother and Nageen's aunt. She despise Nageen.
Hammad Farooqui as Ahmer: Nageen's love interest and wants to marry her however his mother doesn't agree to their marriage.
Fariya Hassan as Samna: Junaid's sister.
Faisal Naqvi as Ghazanfar: Samna's husband.
Ammy Khan as Fariha: Samna's sister-in-law, Ghazanfar's aister
Nida Mumtaz: Ahmer's mother.
Majid Khan as Ruhaab: Nazneen's younger brother.
Ayesha Khan Jr as Suhana: Ruhaab's wife and Nazneen's sister-in-law.
Mariam Tiwana as Maida: Nageen's university friend.
Falak Naaz as Rukhsana: maid at Junaid's home.
Husna Khan: Ahmer's sister.
Muhammad Bilal (child star) as Hadi: Junaid and Nazneen's son.
Mubasira Khanum: Hadi's school principal.

References

External links

 Aitebar - 7th Sky Entertainment

2015 Pakistani television series debuts
2016 Pakistani television series endings